Hoffstad is a Norwegian surname. Notable people with the surname include:

Arne Hoffstad (1900–1980), Norwegian newspaper editor and politician
Einar Hoffstad (1894–1959), Norwegian encyclopedist, newspaper editor, writer and economist
Olaf Alfred Hoffstad (1865–1943), Norwegian botanist, writer, educator and politician

Norwegian-language surnames